Sweet Sue may refer to:

Sweet Sue (comic strip), a British comic strip by Bill Ritchie
Sweet Sue (play), a 1986 play by A. R. Gurney
 "Sweet Sue, Just You", a 1928 jazz song
Sweet Sue, a brand of canned meats owned by Bumble Bee Foods specializing in chicken